Ust-Ilimsk is a town in Irkutsk Oblast, Russia, located on the Angara River. Population:    53,000 (1977).

History
An ostrog (fortress) was built on the present site of the town in the 17th century; however, the modern town was not founded until 1966, during the construction of the Ust-Ilimsk Hydroelectric Power Station, which backs up both the Angara and the Ilim Rivers, and, incidentally, flooded the old town of Ilimsk, which was located further up the Ilim. The region was the site of one of the most notorious gulags of the 1930s  ; tens of thousands died in the camp  .

Town status was granted to it in 1973; the dam was completed in 1980.

Administrative and municipal status
Within the framework of administrative divisions, Ust-Ilimsk serves as the administrative center of Ust-Ilimsky District, even though it is not a part of it. As an administrative division, it is incorporated separately as the Town of Ust-Ilimsk—an administrative unit with the status equal to that of the districts. As a municipal division, the Town of Ust-Ilimsk is incorporated as Ust-Ilimsk Urban Okrug.

Climate
Ust-Ilimsk has a subarctic climate (Köppen Dfc) with warm, humid summers and severely cold, drier winters. Precipitation is moderate and is somewhat higher in summer than at other times of the year. Sunshine is generous and the area receives 2,011 hours of bright sunshine annually.

Economy and infrastructure
Alongside the hydroelectric plant, a thermal power plant, sawmills and industries such as food production are employers in the town.

A  branch railway connects Ust-Ilimsk to Khrebetovka on the Baikal-Amur Mainline. The town is also connected by road to Bratsk.

Ust-Ilimsk has a tram line, constructed by a local timber company to connect the city center with a nearby sawmill. Construction of the tramway began in 1982, with its opening in 1985. Traffic is coordinated to coincide with shift change times at the mill, as well as hourly runs outside these times. There are plans to extend the line to a new mill to the north of the town, as well as to the city railway station.

The Ust-Ilimsk Airport was closed in 2001.

Sports
Lesokhimik is a professional bandy club which played in the highest division of the Russian Bandy League between 2004 and 2008.

References

Notes

Sources

External links
Official website of Ust-Ilimsk 
Ust-Ilimsk Online
Ust-Ilimsk Tramway 

Cities and towns in Irkutsk Oblast
Populated places established in 1966
Cities and towns built in the Soviet Union